Aethiothemis bella  is a species of dragonfly in the family Libellulidae.

References

Libellulidae
Insects described in 1939